The 1914 United States Senate elections, with the ratification of the 17th Amendment in 1913, was the first time that all seats up for election were popularly elected instead of chosen by their state legislatures. And thus it became the first time that they were generally scheduled on Election Day to coincide with the U.S. House elections. The 32 seats of Class 3 were contested in regular elections in 1914. Special elections were also held to fill vacancies. These elections occurred in the middle of Democratic President Woodrow Wilson's first term.

This would also be the first time since the passage of the 17th amendment that the president's party gained Senate seats and lost House seats, something that would be repeated by Democrats in 1962 and 2022, and by Republicans in 1970 and 2018. This would be the last time until 2022 that no incumbent senator would lose reelection in a general election, with every single incumbent who sought reelection winning in the general, although two would lose their primaries.

Results Summary  
 Majority party: Democratic (55 seats)
 Minority party: Republican (41 seats)
 Other parties: 0
 Total seats: 96

Gains, losses, and holds

Retirements
Four Republicans and four Democrats retired instead of seeking re-election.

Defeats
Two Republicans sought re-election but lost in the primary election.

Deaths
One Democrat died on August 8th, 1913, and his seat remained vacant until a May 11th, 1914 special election.

Change in composition

Before the elections

Elections results

Beginning of the next Congress

Summary of races

Special elections during the 63rd Congress 
In these special elections, the winners were seated once elected and qualified; ordered by election date.

Races leading to the 64th Congress 
In these general elections, the winners were elected for the term beginning March 4, 1915; ordered by state.

All of the elections involved the Class 3 seats.

Closest races 
Nineteen races had a margin of victory under 10%:

Alabama 

Democrat Joseph F. Johnston died August 8, 1913.  Democrat Henry D. Clayton was appointed August 12, 1913, but his appointment was challenged and withdrawn. Democrat Franklin P. Glass was appointed November 17, 1913, but the Senate refused to seat him.

Alabama (special) 

Democrat Francis S. White was elected May 11, 1914 to finish the current term that would end in 1915.

Alabama (regular) 

After White retired, House Majority Leader Oscar Underwood was elected to a new term.

Arizona 

Incumbent Democrat Marcus A. Smith was elected in 1912 with 50% of the vote and sought re-election. Although he easily defeated his primary challenger, he faced a large field of candidates in the general election. State Senator and trader Don Lorenzo Hubbell was the Republican nominee. Third party candidates included Eugene W. Chafin of the Prohibition Party, who ran for president under the party's nomination, as well as Socialist Bert Davis and Progressive J. Bernard Nelson.

Smith received over half of the vote, defeating each candidate by a wide margin. He was elected to his second term.

Arkansas

California 

Incumbent Republican George Clement Perkins was first elected in an 1895 special election and was re-elected for three more terms. He did not seek re-election.

U.S. Representative Joseph R. Knowland was the Republican nominee for this seat in 1914. He was challenged by the Democratic nominee, former mayor of San Francisco James Duval Phelan, and the Progressive nominee Francis J. Heney, the former attorney general of the Arizona Territory.

Phelan defeated Heney and Knowland by slim margins and less than a third of the vote.

Colorado

Connecticut

Florida 

Incumbent Democrat Duncan Fletcher was elected in a special election after being appointed when William Hall Milton retired after a year in office. He sought re-election to a full term, facing competition only in the primary.

Georgia 

There were two elections due to the February 14, 1914 death of Democrat Augustus Octavius Bacon. It was the first time that both of Georgia's Senate seats have been up for election at the same time.

Georgia (special) 

Democrat William West was appointed to continue the term pending a special election, in which he was not a candidate.

Democrat Thomas W. Hardwick was elected November 3, 1914 to finish the term that would end in 1919 and served until losing renomination in 1918.

Georgia (regular) 

Democrat M. Hoke Smith, who had first won in a 1911 special election, was re-elected and would serve until his 1920 renomination loss.

Idaho

Illinois

Indiana

Iowa

Kansas

Kentucky 

There were 2 elections to the same seat due to the May 23, 1914 death of one-term Republican William O. Bradley.

Kentucky (special) 

Democrat Johnson N. Camden was appointed June 16, 1914 to continue Bradley's term, pending a special election. He was challenged by U.S. Solicitor General William Marshall Bullitt.

Camden was elected in November to finish the term ending 1915.

Kentucky (regular) 

Democratic appointee Johnson N. Camden was not a candidate for the next term, instead returning to agricultural activities on a farm.

In this race, two former governors of Kentucky fought for the seat. The Democratic nominee was John C. W. Beckham, who was sworn in after the assassination of William Goebel in 1900. The Republican nominee was Augustus E. Willson, who flipped the seat in 1907 after Beckham's term ended.

Beckham won the election, and would continue to serve until his re-election loss.

Louisiana 

Senator Robert F. Broussard had already been elected on May 21, 1912 indirectly by the state legislature.

Maryland

Missouri

Nevada

New Hampshire

New York

North Carolina

North Dakota

Ohio 

Republican nominee Warren G. Harding, future President of the United States, defeated Democratic nominee Timothy S. Hogan to succeed retiring incumbent Republican Senator Theodore E. Burton.

Initially, Harding was not interested in running for U.S. Senate, due to the divisive remnants of the 1912 elections between the conservative and progressive factions of the Republican party. Harry Daugherty, an Ohio political boss, was interested in running for the seat himself upon learning of incumbent Senator Theodore Burton's plans to retire upon the expiration of his term, but party leaders advised him not to run. Instead, Daugherty unsuccessfully attempted to stage a draft movement to convince Harding to run for the seat. After the death of Amos Kling, the father of Harding's wife Florence, she encouraged her husband to run. The precise reasoning for this is unknown, but some in Marion, the Hardings' home town, believe that Harding had agreed not to seek higher office as part of a reuniting "truce" between Florence and her father, or that Kling had convinced Harding that it would behoove him to further his business rather than run for public office.

Although Daugherty claimed it was him who had convinced Harding to run for the Senate, Harding's friend and attorney Hoke Donithen, who eventually became Harding's campaign manager, may have played a role in his decision to run. Retiring Senator Theodore Burton also claimed credit, saying to his biographer that Daugherty did not agree to throw his support behind Harding until after learning he had backed him.

The Republican primary was a three-way contest between Harding, former U.S. Senator and ex-mentor Joseph B. Foraker and Ralph Cole. Rather than antagonizing his opponents, Harding notably tried to keep and make friends within the Republican party, to the frustration of those running against him. Ralph Cole, in his frustration, said, "If he is not going to fight someone, why did he enter the contest?" Harding eventually defeated both of his opponents in the primary, garnering 88,540 votes. Foraker finished in second with 76,817 votes, ahead of Cole with 52,237.

In the general election campaign, Harding faced Democratic nominee Timothy Hogan and Progressive candidate Arthur Garford. Hogan was subject to anti-Catholic sentiment among voters, which Harding himself did not exhibit during the course of the election. Harding's supporters accused Hogan of wanting to "deliver Ohio to the Pope." Harding downplayed the issue of World War I, despite the fact that the election took place just after the outbreak of the war, due to the high German immigrant population. Harding ultimately won the election and subsequently became the first United States Senator from Ohio to be popularly elected, following the passage of the 17th Amendment to the Constitution.

Harding's victory in his bid for the Senate seat raised speculation that he would seek higher office, specifically the Presidency, although Harding himself did not show any interest in doing so at the time. He told family and friends after being elected to the Senate that he would return to his previous career in newspaper publishing at The Marion Daily Star after serving in the Senate.

Oklahoma

Oregon

Pennsylvania

South Carolina

South Dakota

Utah

Vermont

Washington

Wisconsin

See also 
 1914 United States elections
 1914 United States House of Representatives elections
 63rd United States Congress
 64th United States Congress

Notes

References

Bibliography